Dimana Krastevitch-Rangelov (born 26 March 1982) is a retired tennis player from Bulgaria.

Biography
A left-handed player from Sofia, Krastevitch began her career on the ITF Circuit in the 1997 season. 

She reached her best singles ranking of 222 in the world in 2003.

As a doubles player, she was a quarterfinalist at a WTA Tour tournament in Philadelphia in 2003, and in the same year won a $25,000 doubles event in Lenzerheide, Switzerland.

In 2006, Krastevitch appeared in three Fed Cup ties for Bulgaria, against Hungary, Great Britain and Ukraine.

Retiring in 2007, she now lives in the US state of Florida.

ITF Circuit finals

Singles: 3 (3 runner–ups)

Doubles: 4 (1 title, 3 runner–ups)

References

External links
 
 
 

1982 births
Living people
Bulgarian female tennis players
Sportspeople from Sofia
Bulgarian emigrants to the United States